The Château d'Aubigny in the parish and manor of Aubigny-sur-Nère in the ancient province of Berry in France, is an historic ancestral seat of a junior branch of the Scottish House of Stewart, known by the territorial title Seigneur d'Aubigny. It is known to the French as the Château des Stuarts.

History
The estate was first acquired by Sir John Stewart of Darnley, 1st Comte d'Évreux, 1st Seigneur de Concressault, 1st Seigneur d'Aubigny ( 1380 – 1429), a Scottish nobleman and famous military commander who served as Constable of the Scottish Army in France, supporting the French against the English during the Hundred Years War. He was a fourth cousin of King James I of Scotland (reigned 1406 to 1437), the third monarch of the House of Stewart.

See also
Château de la Verrerie (Cher), another Stewart seat at Oizon, 14 miles south-east of Aubigny.
Stewart of Darnley

Further reading
Gaspard Thaumas de la Thaumassiere, Histoire de Berry, Paris, 1689, pp. 697–702 
Cust, Lady Elizabeth, Some Account of the Stuarts of Aubigny, in France, London, 1891

References

Châteaux in France